Nallamalupu Bujji is an Indian film producer in Telugu cinema. In 2001, he ventured into film production, by forming Sri Lakshmi Narasimha Productions. He won two Nandi Awards.

Filmography

As Producer

Awards
 Nandi Awards
 Best Feature Film - Bronze - Lakshyam (2007)
 Best Home Viewing Feature Film - Konchem Ishtam Konchem Kashtam (2009)

Other Awards
B. Nagi Reddy Memorial Award - Race Gurram (shared with Dr. Venkateswara Rao)
Santosham Best Producer Award - Race Gurram (shared with Dr. Venkateswara Rao)

References

External links
 

Living people
Film producers from Andhra Pradesh
Telugu film producers
People from Guntur
Year of birth missing (living people)
People from Guntur district
Santosham Film Awards winners
Indian film producers